The 2015–16 New Orleans Privateers women's basketball team represented the University of New Orleans during the 2015–16 NCAA Division I women's basketball season. The Privateers, led by fifth year head coach Keeshawn Davenport, played their home games at Lakefront Arena. They are members of the Southland Conference. They finished the season 8–13, 5–13 in Southland play to finish in eleventh place. They failed to qualify for the Southland women's tournament.

Roster

Schedule

|-
!colspan=9 style="background:#003399; color:#C0C0C0;"| Out of Conference Schedule

|-
!colspan=9 style="background:#003399; color:#C0C0C0;"| Southland Conference Schedule

See also
 2015–16 New Orleans Privateers men's basketball team

References

New Orleans Privateers women's basketball seasons
New Orleans
New
New